Caladenia heberleana, commonly known as Heberle's spider orchid, is a species of orchid endemic to the south-west of Western Australia. It has a single, hairy leaf and up to three red, white and pale yellow flowers which have a white, red-tipped labellum.

Description
The flowers are red, white and pale yellow with spreading lateral sepals and petals, all of which have thickened, club-like glandular tips. The lateral sepals and petals spread widely but directed downwards below the horizontal. Flowering occurs from September to October.

Taxonomy and naming
Caladenia heberleana was first described in 2001 by Stephen Hopper and Andrew Phillip Brown from a specimen collected in the Hassell National Park, and the description was published in Nuytsia. The specific epithet (heberleana) honours Ron Heberle, an orchid enthusiast.

Distribution and habitat
Heberle's spider orchid occurs between Augusta and Cape Arid in the Esperance Plains, Jarrah Forest and Mallee biogeographic regions, where it usually grows in deep sandy soil in woodland. Its flowering is stimulated by summer fires but flowering plants are also found around areas that are swampy in winter, even in the absence of earlier fires.

Conservation
Caladenia heberleana is classified as "not threatened" by the Government of Western Australia Department of Parks and Wildlife.

References

heberleana
Orchids of Western Australia
Endemic orchids of Australia
Plants described in 2001
Endemic flora of Western Australia
Taxa named by Stephen Hopper
Taxa named by Andrew Phillip Brown